Ditmars Boulevard, originally known as Ditmars Avenue, is a street located in northwest Queens, New York City. It is divided into two segments; one travels through the neighborhood of Ditmars, located within Astoria, and the other acts as a service road for the Grand Central Parkway near LaGuardia Airport in East Elmhurst.

Route description
Ditmars Boulevard begins at an intersection with Shore Boulevard in Astoria on the banks of the East River, just north of Astoria Park. The road continues to the east until it reaches the western edge of LaGuardia Airport, terminating at an intersection with 81st Street, north of Bowery Bay Boulevard and near Marine Air Terminal.

Southeast of this intersection, on the other side of the Grand Central Parkway, the road begins again, as a continuation of a short segment of 86th Street (which itself begins at 23rd Avenue) in East Elmhurst. This segment is one-way eastbound, merging with the eastbound exit ramp of exit 6 on the Grand Central, which serves 94th Street. At 94th Street, a main arterial which provides access to and from the airport, the road becomes two-way. It provides an eastbound entrance ramp, and shortly intersects a traffic circle with 23rd Avenue that also provides an alternate entrance to the airport (closer to terminals C and D). Now taking a more southern direction, Ditmars continues east along the Grand Central and merges with an exit 8 offramp. Shortly after, Ditmars terminates at an intersection with Astoria Boulevard, continuing south as 111th Street for one more block before terminating at Northern Boulevard (NY 25A).

History
The earliest Ditmars ancestor was Jan Jansen Ditmarsen (John the Son of John from Ditmars) who immigrated to America from Holstein in Germany. The first Ditmars settled in Dutch Kills about 1647. Ditmars Boulevard and the East River was the site of Dr. Dow Ditmars' home. The doctor, who died in 1860 at age 90, was held in high esteem by the community. A son, Abram Ditmars, later became the first Mayor of Long Island City in 1870. Later, Steinway and Sons, the piano manufacturer, had a final assembly factory on Ditmars Boulevard until the 1960s.

Transportation
The Astoria–Ditmars Boulevard station is the last stop on the New York City Subway's BMT Astoria Line. The approach to the Hell Gate Bridge is on a masonry viaduct over that station. In addition, MTA Bus's Q69 route runs along 21st Street and the western half of Ditmars Boulevard, while New York City Bus's Q48 route operates from LaGuardia Airport and runs along the eastern half of Ditmars Boulevard from 102nd Street to Astoria Boulevard before going down 108th Street toward its eastern terminus at Flushing–Main Street.

In popular culture
The boulevard is the location of Brett Weir's apartment in Jerky Boys: The Movie, as a symbol for moving up in the city.

References

External links
  Where the Piano Meets the Bouzouki – The New York Times February 18, 1996
 Life on Ditmars and Part 2 – Forgotten NY
 A Walk Down Ditmars Boulevard – Bridge and Tunnel Club

Streets in Queens, New York
Astoria, Queens
East Elmhurst, Queens